Katenan (also Romanized as Katenān) is a village in Bakesh-e Yek Rural District, in the Central District of Mamasani County, Fars Province, Iran. At the 2006 census, its population was 37, in 7 families.

References 

Populated places in Mamasani County